Alonso de Llera Zambrano was a Spanish painter, active during the Baroque period. He was born in Cádiz, flourished in that city as a painter of banners for the royal navy, and executed, in 1639, altarpieces for the oratories of four galleons dispatched in that year to New Spain.

References

 

Year of birth missing
Year of death missing
People from Cádiz
Spanish Baroque painters
17th-century Spanish painters
Spanish male painters